Barendregt is a Dutch surname. Notable people with the surname include:

 Jaap Barendregt (1905–1952), Dutch footballer
 Johan Barendregt (1924–1982), Dutch chess player
 Henk Barendregt (born 1947), Dutch logician

Dutch-language surnames